Herbert Walter Fairman (1907 – 1982) was a British Egyptologist. During his career he served as a field director for two excavations in Egypt that were funded by the Egypt Exploration Society.

Biography
Fairman was born in the town of Clare, Suffolk, in 1907. He was educated in Kent and received a degree in Egyptology from the University of Liverpool's department of archaeology. His father worked as a missionary in Egypt and the Sudan, and as such Fairman spent a good deal of time in both countries.

As a trained Egyptologist, Fairman worked on multiple archaeological projects in Egypt; at Armant from 1929 to 1931, El-Amarnah in 1930 to 1936, at Sesebi from 1936 to 1938, and at Amarah West from 1938 to 1939 and 1947–48. His work at Amarah West was interrupted by the Second World War, during which Fairman was conscripted into the British Armed Forces and worked at the British embassy in Cairo. While working in Cairo, Fairman was known to give lectures on the history of Egypt to Commonwealth soldiers in his spare time. Following the war, Fairman became the field director of the Egypt Exploration Society and Brunner Professor of Egyptology (1948–1974) at his alma mater, the University of Liverpool.

Fairman published a number of books on Egyptology during his life. One such work was a translation of an ancient Egyptian play, which Fairman named The Triumph of Horus.

References

British Egyptologists
1907 births
1982 deaths